Abode Solicitors Ltd traded as Arc Property Solicitors and was a firm of conveyancing solicitors with offices in Harrogate and London. The firm was recognised by The Lawyer in 2011 as a top 10 UK law firm by revenue per partner. There are around 9000 law firms in the UK.

In 2013 the firm was closed down by the Solicitors Regulation Authority following an investigation into the practices of the firm by the Inland Revenue. It is understood that the firm was duping customers into a scheme where they could legally avoid paying SDLT when purchasing a property. The firm made promises to a large number of clients that if there was any investigation into the scheme by HMRC which resulted in SDLT having to be paid, they would refund the fees that they charged for the scheme.

These fees propelled Adobe Solicitors Ltd t/a Arc Property Solicitors into the top 10 law firms by revenue in the UK. The firm no longer exists and the money has not been traced.

References

The Lawyer UK200
The Lawyer revenue per partner list
Stephensons

External links

Official Website

Law firms of the United Kingdom